An election was held on November 6, 2018 to elect 25 members to Montana's Senate. The election coincided with elections for other offices, including the U.S Senate, U.S. House of Representatives, and state house. The primary election was held on June 2, 2018.

Results summary

Close races
Districts where the margin of victory was under 10%:
District 14, 1.48%
District 12, 2.9%
District 49, 3.18%
District 32, 3.59% gain
District 24, 7.98%
District 30, 8.84%
District 13, 9.26%

Incumbents defeated in the primary election
Pat Connell (R-District 43), defeated by Jason Ellsworth (R)

Incumbents defeated in the general election
Jedediah Hinkle (R-District 32), defeated by Pat Flowers (D)

Open seats that changed parties
Edward Buttrey (R-District 11) was term-limited, seat won by Tom Jacobson (D)

Summary of results by State Senate District

Detailed Results

Districts 1–22

District 1
Incumbent Republican Chas Vincent has represented the 1st district since 2011. Vincent was term-limited and couldn't seek re-election.

District 4
Incumbent Republican Mark Blasdel has represented the 4th district since 2014.

District 5
Incumbent Republican Bob Keenan has represented the 4th district since 2015.

District 8
Incumbent Democrat Lea Whitford has represented the 8th district since 2015. Whitford didn't seek re-election.

District 9
Incumbent Republican Llew Jones has represented the 9th district since 2011. Jones was term-limited and successfully ran for a seat in the state house.

District 11
Incumbent Republican Edward Buttrey has represented the 11th district and its predecessors since 2011. Buttrey was term-limited and successfully ran for a seat in the state house. State Representative Tom Jacobson, a Democrat, won the open seat.

District 12
Incumbent Democrat Carlie Boland has represented the 12th district since 2017.

District 13
Incumbent Republican Brian Hoven has represented the 13th district since 2015.

District 14
Incumbent Republican Russel Tempel has represented the 14th district since 2017.

District 19
Incumbent Republican Eric Moore has represented the 19th district and its predecessors since 2011. Moore was term-limited and successfully ran for a seat in the state house.

District 20
Incumbent Republican Duane Ankney has represented the 20th district since 2015.

District 22
Incumbent Republican Douglas Kary has represented the 22nd district since 2015.

Districts 24–50

District 24
Incumbent Democrat Mary McNally has represented the 24th district since 2015.

District 27
Incumbent Republican Cary Smith has represented the 27th district since 2015.

District 29
Incumbent Republican David Howard has represented the 29th district since 2015.

District 30
Incumbent Republican Nels Swandal has represented the 30th district since 2015. Swandal didn't seek re-election.

District 32
Incumbent Republican Jedediah Hinkle has represented the 32nd district since 2014. He lost re-election to Democrat Pat Flowers.

District 33
Incumbent Democrat Jennifer Pomnichowski has represented the 33rd district since 2015.

District 34
Incumbent Republican Gordon Vance has represented the 34th district since 2015.

District 41
Incumbent Democrat Mary Caferro has represented the 41st district and its predecessors since 2011. Caferro was term-limited and successfully ran for a seat in the state house. State representative Janet Ellis won the open seat.

District 42
Incumbent Democrat Jill Cohenour has represented the 43rd district since 2015.

District 43
Incumbent Republican Pat Connell has represented the 43rd district since 2015. Connell lost re-nomination to fellow Republican Jason Ellsworth.

District 48
Incumbent Democrat Nate McConnell has represented the 48th district since 2018.

District 49
Incumbent Democrat Diane Sands has represented the 49th district since 2015.

District 50
Incumbent Democrat Tom Facey has represented the 50th district and its predecessors since 2011. Facey was term-limited and couldn't seek re-election. State Representative Bryce Bennett won the open seat.

References

2018 Montana elections
Montana Senate
November 2018 events in the United States
Montana Senate elections